Brittany Lynnette Spears (born September 27, 1988) is a basketball player and former guard for the University of Colorado women's basketball team.  At 6'1", Spears averaged 18 points and eight rebounds in her senior season for the Buffaloes. During her four years at Colorado, Spears scored 2,185 points and averaged 17 points per game for her career, which is seventh-best in the history of the Big 12. Spears ranks first at CU in career field goals made, scoring average, 3-point attempts and minutes in game.

On April 11, 2011, the Phoenix Mercury chose Brittany Spears as their second round pick in the WNBA draft. The all-Big 12 Conference forward was taken with the 19th pick overall. Spears is the fourth CU women's basketball player to be drafted by the WNBA.

Colorado statistics
Source

References

1988 births
Living people
American expatriate basketball people in Germany
American expatriate basketball people in Israel
American expatriate basketball people in Poland
American expatriate basketball people in Spain
American women's basketball players
Colorado Buffaloes women's basketball players
Forwards (basketball)
Pasadena High School (California) alumni
Phoenix Mercury draft picks